Klugeana is a genus of moths of the family Noctuidae.

The South African species Klugeana philoxalis has been proposed as being of interest as a possible biocontrol agent for dealing with invasive Oxalis pes-caprae in countries where it is a problem. Like many Noctuids, Klugeana philoxalis  has larvae that are nocturnal feeders that hide by day. If suddenly illuminated when feeding in the dark, they drop to the ground.

References

Natural History Museum Lepidoptera genus database

Cuculliinae